Millertown may refer to:

Millertown, Newfoundland and Labrador, a town
Millertown, Ohio, an unincorporated community in Perry County
Millertown, West Virginia, an unincorporated community in Taylor County

See also
Millertown Junction